Emilio D'Amore (26 November 1915 – 21 October 2017) was an Italian writer, journalist, and politician.

A native of Montefalcione, D'Amore was born on 26 November 1915. He was first elected to the Chamber of Deputies in 1948 as a representative of the Monarchist National Party. D'Amore joined the Italian Democratic Party of Monarchist Unity (PDIUM) and won reelection in 1953. He served a final term in the Chamber of Deputies from 1963 to 1968, again as a member of the PDIUM.

References

1915 births
2017 deaths
People from the Province of Avellino
Monarchist National Party politicians
Italian Democratic Party of Monarchist Unity politicians
Deputies of Legislature I of Italy
Deputies of Legislature II of Italy
Deputies of Legislature IV of Italy
Politicians of Campania
Italian centenarians
Men centenarians